Joseph Makinson (born 25 August 1836 at Higher Broughton, Salford, Lancashire; died 14 March 1914 at Sale, Cheshire) was an English amateur cricketer who played first-class cricket from 1856 to 1873.

Joseph Makinson was educated at Huddersfield College, Owen's College, Manchester and Trinity College, Cambridge. A right-handed batsman, occasional wicket-keeper and right arm medium pace roundarm bowler who  was mainly associated with Cambridge University and Lancashire, he made 27 known appearances in first-class matches.  He played for the Gentlemen in the Gentlemen v Players series.  

Makinson was called to the Bar from Lincoln's Inn in 1864, and practised on the Northern Circuit. From 1866 to 1878 he was Deputy Coroner for Manchester and from 1878 until his death in 1914 he was the Stipendiary Magistrate of Salford.

References

External links
 CricketArchive profile

Further reading
 H S Altham, A History of Cricket, Volume 1 (to 1914), George Allen & Unwin, 1962
 Arthur Haygarth, Scores & Biographies, Volumes 1-11 (1744-1870), Lillywhite, 1862-72

1836 births
1914 deaths
Alumni of Trinity College, Cambridge
English cricketers of 1826 to 1863
English cricketers of 1864 to 1889
Cambridge University cricketers
Gentlemen cricketers
Lancashire cricketers
People from Broughton, Greater Manchester
Manchester Cricket Club cricketers
Gentlemen of the North cricketers
Cambridge Town Club cricketers
North v South cricketers
Stipendiary magistrates (England and Wales)